Germán Martínez Cázares (born June 20, 1967 in Quiroga, Michoacán) is a Mexican politician and lawyer. He was a member of the National Action Party.

Martínez Cázares holds a degree in law from the Universidad La Salle. Has a Specialty in Constitutional Law and Political Sciences from the Center for Political and Constitutional Studies (Madrid). Pursued Doctoral Studies in Constitutional Law at the Universidad Complutense. He has given lectures on law and politics at Harvard University and various Mexican universities. Has also taught law at the Universidad Anáhuac.

His career
 Federal Deputy during the 57th Session (1997–2000), where he was President of the Population Commission and member of COCOPA.
 Federal Deputy during the 59th Session (2003–2006) where he was Assistant Coordinator for the National Action Party Parliamentary Group, member of the Commissions for Constitutional Points and Culture and the Committee for the Center for Legal Studies and Parliamentary Research and the Group of Friendship between Mexico and Spain.
 Within the National Action Party, he has been a member of the National Executive Committee, Secretary of Party Studies and Director General of the Rafael Preciado Hernández Foundation.
 He has written for several publications, include the El Economista newspaper and a weekly journal called Proceso. He has coauthored a selection of texts on Carlos Castillo Peraza, published by Fondo de Cultura Económica.
 He represented the National Action Party in the General Council of the Federal Electoral Institute in the 2000 and 2006 electoral processes.
 Member of president elect Felipe Calderón's transition team.
 2007: Elected as the 19th party president. He resigned on July 6, 2009 because of the electoral defeat of his party in the 2009 Mexican elections.
 Legal director before the Consejo General del Instituto Federal Electoral (Federal Election Commission).
 December 3, 2018: General Director of the Mexican Social Security Institute. On May 21, 2019, Martínez Cázares resigned, complaining of a lack of resources and blaming it on the austerity budget of the Department of Treasury (Hacienda). On May 22, he requested to be reinstated in the Senate.

References

External links
 National Action Party website
 Proceso magazine article

1967 births
20th-century Mexican lawyers
National Action Party (Mexico) politicians
Academic staff of Universidad Anáhuac México
People from Morelia
Politicians from Michoacán
Living people
Complutense University of Madrid alumni
Members of the Chamber of Deputies (Mexico)
20th-century Mexican politicians
21st-century Mexican politicians
21st-century Mexican lawyers